King Xi may refer to these ancient Chinese monarchs:

King Xi of Zhou (died 677 BC)
King Xi of Han (died 273 BC)

See also
Duke Xi (disambiguation)